Ruud Jolie (born Rudolf Adrianus Jolie on 19 April 1976 in Tilburg, Netherlands) is the lead guitarist of the symphonic metal band Within Temptation.

Early life
Ruud is an only child. Growing up, he first initiated himself to music by playing the keyboards, but his passion for music developed in favor of the guitar soon after he watched a video of an Iron Maiden concert. 
Thus, after he was done with high school, Ruud attended the conservatory for his college education majoring in jazz guitar. He graduated in 1999.

Work prior to Within Temptation
Ruud started out by playing with several local bands. He joined Brotherhood Foundation, a nu-metal band whom he stayed with for a period of two years. When Brotherhood Foundation was playing at the 1998 "Dynamo" festival in the Czech Republic, Ruud met Within Temptation who were also playing there. Back then, Michiel Papenhove was still Within Temptation's guitarist, and there were no initial plans for Ruud to join the symphonic metal band yet. 
In an interview with Starfacts, Ruud stated that his most embarrassing gig experience was when he still had long hair and it was caught in the microphone while headbanging. He thought it was doubly embarrassing because the girl he loved was in front row. They never got together.

After Brotherhood Foundation, Ruud joined an alternative rock band "Vals Licht" (False Light) in 2001. This band was known for its combination of heavy music with Dutch lyrics, something that had never been done before. They released several singles on the Dutch market, of which "Het Licht" reached the top ten charts. 
A month after joining "Vals Licht", Ruud got a phone call from Within Temptation asking him to join their band seeing as to guitarist Michiel Papenhove was quitting. Ruud turned them down because he had just committed himself to "Vals Licht" and thought it was not proper to "jump from tree to tree" so quickly. A couple of months later, the late drummer of "Vals Licht", Johann De Groot, was diagnosed with lung cancer. In that same week, Robert Westerholt, the founder and guitarist of Within Temptation, unaware of Johann's condition called Ruud again with the same request. Ruud turned down Within Temptation once again due to the uneasy circumstances "Vals Licht" was going through, but in counterpart offered to become Within Temptation's substitute guitarist until they found themselves a permanent member.

Within Temptation
In the summer of 2001, Within Temptation had a gig in Mexico City. Ruud, as a substitute, travelled along to perform at the concert. This trip really brought Ruud closer to the members of Within Temptation, and made him realize that he wanted to become a permanent member of the band. Unfortunately, Within Temptation had already hired a 'permanent' guitarist. However, when they returned home, luckily for Ruud, that did not work out, and so he received a third and final phone call from Robert asking him to indefinitely join the band, a request to which Ruud finally agreed.

Solo Work
In September 2007, Ruud announced his plans for a solo project, entitled "For All We Know". In a post on his Myspace blog, Ruud said "I decided to call it that because I think that name raises all the questions that don't have immediate answers in an instant. And what is more interesting than searching for answers? Everybody is looking for certain answers I guess. Even subconsciously. Therefore it's multi-interpretable. The only questionable thing about the name that might raise some eyebrows instead of questions is when you pronounce the abbreviation of it; FAWK. Ah well, that's just a minor detail...
Musically it's going to be heavy in the basics. Very guitar oriented of course. It won't be a shred-fest but guitaristically (if that's even a word) interesting. Some keywords that come to mind right now are; Heavy, Hysterical, Melodic, Atmospherically, Ambient, Groovy, Mellow... Check out my influences in the general info section. Then you see what kind of music I listen to. I guess it's inevitable that some of the 'ingredients' of those bands and artist end up in my own musical stew.
And no, it's not going to be something like Within Temptation. What would the use be of doing a side project when it's something like my main band?"
The first album was released on 25 April 2011. On the second album there are vocal contributions by Anneke van Giersbergen and Wudstik.

Maiden uniteD
When the Dutch Iron Maiden fan club asked Joey Bruers to do a special show it had to be something other than the regular tribute or cover band. He asked Ruud to join him together with other musicians from several bands to perform a set of rearranged acoustic Maiden songs. The reactions from the crowd were overwhelming.
The idea that became a show then became a project. A project to bring all kinds of musicians and fans together to celebrate the music. Maiden uniteD presents classic Iron Maiden songs in a new and exciting light. Acoustic re-arrangements that transform the songs into something that Iron Maiden fans would have never imagined hearing.
He's currently recording and producing their third album which should be released in the spring of 2015.

Equipment

Ruud is an official endorser of Mayones guitars. He uses 6 Regius models (6, 7 and 8 string). He also uses a wide range of Paul Reed Smith guitars, Jackson Guitars and Fender guitars. He uses Mesa Boogie rectifier, Diezel VH-4 amplifiers, Fractal Audio Systems Axe-Fx II and Kemper Profiling Amps.

Discography

For All We Know

 For All We Know			2011		
 Take Me Home			2017	

with Within Temptation

 Mother Earth Tour     		2002
 Running Up that Hill (EP)	        	2003
 Stand My Ground (Single) 2004
 The Silent Force      			2004
 Jillian (I'd Give My Heart)    			2005
 The Silent Force Tour			2005
 Memories (Single)			2005
 Angels (Single) 2005
 What Have You Done (Single) 2007
 The Heart of Everything 2007
 Frozen (Single) 2007
 The Howling (EP) 2007
 All I Need (Single) 2007
 Forgiven (Single) 2008
 Black Symphony                           2008
 Utopia (Single) 2009
 An Acoustic Night at the Theatre 2009
 The Unforgiving 2011
 Paradise (What About Us?) EP 2013
 Hydra 2014
 Resist 2018
	

with other bands

 The Outsidaz					(2001)		The Outsidaz
 Attacks When Provoked         	 	        (2002)		Lieke
 All in Hand   				        (2002)		Rosemary’s Sons
 Luidkeels     				        (2003)		Vals Licht
 Woensdag Soundtrack				(2004)		Asura Pictures
 The Rebel in You                                  (2006)            Yellow Pearl
 Live in Europe                                    (2010)            Anneke van Giersbergen & Agua De Annique
 Mind the Acoustic Pieces                      (2010)            Maiden uniteD
 League of Lights (2011) League of Lights
 Weightless Blood                                  (2012)            Rani Chatoorgoon
 Across The Seventh Sea                            (2012)            Maiden uniteD
 Samsara                                           (2016)            Rani Chatoorgoon

References

External links
Interview of Ruud Jolie in Paris (08.10.2007)

1976 births
Living people
Dutch heavy metal guitarists
Dutch male guitarists
Lead guitarists
Musicians from Tilburg
Seven-string guitarists
Within Temptation members